This is a list of Spanish football transfers for the summer sale in the 2016–17 season of La Liga and Segunda División. Only moves from La Liga and Segunda División are listed.

The summer transfer window began on 1 July 2016, although a few transfers took place prior to that date. The window closed at midnight on 1 September 2016. Players without a club can join one at any time, either during or in between transfer windows. Clubs below La Liga level can also sign players on loan at any time. If needed, clubs can sign a goalkeeper on an emergency loan, if all others are unavailable.

La Liga

Alavés 
Manager:  Mauricio Pellegrino (1st season)

In:

Out:

Athletic Bilbao 
Manager:  Ernesto Valverde (4th season)

In:

Out:

Atlético Madrid 
Manager:  Diego Simeone (6th season)

In:

Out:

Barcelona 
Manager:  Luis Enrique (3rd season)

In:

Out:

Betis 
Manager:  Gus Poyet (1st season)

In:

Out:

Celta Vigo 
Manager:  Eduardo Berizzo (3rd season)

In:

Out:

Deportivo La Coruña 
Manager:  Gaizka Garitano (1st season)

In:

Out:

Eibar 
Manager:  José Luis Mendilibar (2nd season)

In:

Out:

Espanyol 
Manager:  Quique Sánchez Flores (1st season)

In:

Out:

Granada 
Manager:  Paco Jémez (1st season)

In:

Out:

Las Palmas 
Manager:  Quique Setién (2nd season)

In:

Out:

Leganés 
Manager:  Asier Garitano (4th season)

In:

Out:

Málaga 
Manager:  Juande Ramos (1st season)

In:

Out:

Osasuna 
Manager:  Enrique Martín (3rd season)

In:

Out:

|-

Real Madrid 
Manager:  Zinedine Zidane (2nd season)

In:

Out:

Real Sociedad 
Manager:  Eusebio Sacristán (2nd season)

In:

Out:

Sevilla 
Manager:  Jorge Sampaoli (1st season)

In:

Out:

|-

Sporting Gijón 
Manager:  Abelardo Fernández (4th season)

In:

Out:

Valencia 
Manager:  Pako Ayestarán (2nd season)

In:

Out:

Villarreal 
Manager:  Fran Escribá (1st season)

In:

Out:

Segunda División

Alcorcón 
Manager:  Cosmin Contra (1st season)

In:

Out:

Almería 
Manager:  Fernando Soriano (2nd season)

In:

Out:

Cádiz 
Manager:  Álvaro Cervera (2nd season)

In:

Out:

Córdoba 
Manager:  José Luis Oltra (2nd season)

In:

Out:

Elche 
Manager:  Alberto Toril (1st season)

In:

Out:

Getafe 
Manager:  Juan Esnáider (2nd season)

In:

Out:

Gimnàstic Tarragona 
Manager:  Vicente Moreno (4th season)

In:

Out:

Girona 
Manager:  Pablo Machín (4th season)

In:

Out:

Huesca 
Manager:  Juan Antonio Anquela (2nd season)

In:

Out:

Levante 
Manager:  Juan Muñiz (1st season)

In:

Out:

Lugo 
Manager:  Luis César Sampedro (1st season)

In:

Out:

Mallorca 
Manager:  Fernando Vázquez (2nd season)

In:

Out:

Mirandés 
Manager:  Carlos Terrazas (4th season)

In:

Out:

Numancia 
Manager:  Jagoba Arrasate (2nd season)

In:

Out:

Oviedo 
Manager:  Fernando Hierro (1st season)

In:

Out:

Rayo Vallecano 
Manager:  José Ramón Sandoval (1st season)

In:

Out:

Reus 
Manager:  Natxo González (3rd season)

In:

Out:

Sevilla Atlético 
Manager:  Diego Martínez (3rd season)

In:

Out:

Tenerife 
Manager:  José Luis Martí (2nd season)

In:

Out:

UCAM Murcia 
Manager:  José María Salmerón (2nd season)

In:

Out:

Valladolid 
Manager:  Paco Herrera (1st season)

In:

Out:

Zaragoza 
Manager:  Luis Milla (1st season)

In:

Out:

References

Transfers
Spain
2016